Battlestar Galactica is a 1979 board game published by FASA.

Gameplay
Battlestar Galactica is a wargame based on the 1978 Battlestar Galactica TV series, involving starfighter combat in Vipers and Raiders.

Reception
Craig Sheeley reviewed Battlestar Galactica in Space Gamer No. 73. Sheeley commented that "Battlestar Galactica lives up to its subtitle: 'A game of starfighter combat.'  If you love Galactica, or Vipers, this game is for you. Don't expect to be able to slug it out Battlestar to Base Ship, though."

References

External links 

 
Battlestar Galactica games
Board games based on television series
Board games introduced in 1984
FASA games